Pristimantis lentiginosus is a species of frogs in the family Craugastoridae.

It is found in Colombia and Venezuela. Its natural habitats are tropical moist montane forests, rivers, and heavily degraded former forest. It is threatened by habitat loss.

References

lentiginosus
Amphibians of Colombia
Amphibians of Venezuela
Amphibians described in 1984
Taxonomy articles created by Polbot
Taxobox binomials not recognized by IUCN